Statistics of Ekstraklasa for the 1954 season.

Overview
It was contested by 12 teams, and Polonia Bytom won the championship.

League table

Results

Top goalscorers

References
Poland – List of final tables at RSSSF 

Ekstraklasa seasons
1
Pol
Pol